Sam James may refer to:

Sam James (EastEnders), fictional character
Sam James (rugby union) (born 1994), English rugby union player
Samantha James (born 1979), American singer

See also
Samuel James (disambiguation)